Ivanov is a French band, one-hit wonder, composed of Aliocha Berman, Walter Troiani, Patrick Laithier, Gilles Petitjean, and Yves Renaud. The band had its greatest hit in 1989, with "Les Nuits sans soleil", which earned a Silver disc and reached number 7 on the French SNEP Singles Chart, in which it stayed for 16 weeks. The next single, "Aventurier", released in 1990, and the album Casser le destin, were not unsuccessful. Band's members were both writers and composers of their singles.

References

French musical groups
Musical groups established in 1989